Vicot is a French surname.

People with the surname 

 Robert Vicot (born 1931) is a French footballer
 Roger Vicot (born 1963), French politician

See also 

 Viot

Surnames
Surnames of French origin
French-language surnames